The following articles list indoor volleyball, beach volleyball, snow volleyball and sitting volleyball records and statistics:

Achievements

Nations 
Indoor volleyball, beach volleyball and sitting volleyball
 Major achievements in volleyball by nation

Indoor volleyball
 List of indoor volleyball world medalists

Clubs 
 Clubs with the most international titles in volleyball

Players, coaches, officials, and leaders 
 International Volleyball Hall of Fame

Rankings

Indoor volleyball 
Worldwide (FIVB)
 FIVB World Rankings

 Europe (CEV)
 CEV European Rankings (Men's Ranking List, Women's Ranking List)

Beach volleyball 
Worldwide (FIVB)
 FIVB Beach Volleyball World Rankings

 Europe (CEV)
 CEV Beach Volleyball European Rankings (Entry Rankings, Country Ranking)

Snow volleyball 
 Europe (CEV)
 CEV Snow Volleyball European Rankings (Entry Rankings)

Sitting volleyball 
Worldwide (WPV)
 WPV Sitting Volleyball World Rankings (World Rankings)

 Europe (PVE)
 PVE Sitting Volleyball European Rankings (European Rankings)

Major international indoor volleyball tournaments

Worldwide (FIVB) 
The Fédération Internationale de Volleyball (FIVB) organizes the following international indoor volleyball tournaments:

Nations (senior)

Nations (under-age)

Clubs

Africa (CAVB) 
The Confédération Africaine de Volleyball (CAVB) organizes the following international indoor volleyball tournaments:

Nations (senior)

Nations (under-age)

Clubs

Asia & Oceania (AVC) 
The Asian Volleyball Confederation (AVC) organizes the following international indoor volleyball tournaments:

Nations (senior)

Nations (under-age)

Clubs

Europe (CEV) 
The Confédération Européenne de Volleyball (CEV) organizes the following international indoor volleyball tournaments:

Nations (senior)

Nations (under-age)

Clubs

Americas (NORCECA & CSV) 
The North, Central America and Caribbean Volleyball Confederation (NORCECA) and the Confederación Sudamericana de Voleibol (CSV) organize the following international indoor volleyball tournaments:

Nations (senior)

Nations (under-age)

North America (NORCECA) 
The North, Central America and Caribbean Volleyball Confederation (NORCECA) organizes the following international indoor volleyball tournaments:

Nations (senior)

Nations (under-age)

South America (CSV) 
The Confederación Sudamericana de Voleibol (CSV) organizes the following international indoor volleyball tournaments:

Nations (senior)

Nations (under-age)

Clubs

Major national top-level indoor volleyball leagues

Africa

Asia & Oceania

Europe

North America

South America

Major international beach volleyball tournaments

Worldwide (FIVB) 
The Fédération Internationale de Volleyball (FIVB) organizes the following international beach volleyball tournaments:

Senior

Under-age

Africa (CAVB) 
The Confédération Africaine de Volleyball (CAVB) organizes the following international beach volleyball tournaments:

Senior

Asia & Oceania (AVC) 
The Asian Volleyball Confederation (AVC) organizes the following international beach volleyball tournaments:

Senior

Under-age

Europe (CEV) 
The Confédération Européenne de Volleyball (CEV) organizes the following international beach volleyball tournaments:

Senior

Under-age

Americas (NORCECA & CSV) 
The North, Central America and Caribbean Volleyball Confederation (NORCECA) and the Confederación Sudamericana de Voleibol (CSV) organize the following international beach volleyball tournaments:

Senior

North America (NORCECA) 
The North, Central America and Caribbean Volleyball Confederation (NORCECA) organizes the following international beach volleyball tournaments:

Senior

South America (CSV) 
The Confederación Sudamericana de Voleibol (CSV) organizes the following international beach volleyball tournaments:

Senior

Major international snow volleyball tournaments

Worldwide (FIVB) 
The Fédération Internationale de Volleyball (FIVB) organizes the following international snow volleyball tournaments:

Senior

Europe (CEV) 
The Confédération Européenne de Volleyball (CEV) organizes the following international snow volleyball tournaments:

Senior

Major international sitting volleyball tournaments

Worldwide (WPV) 
The World ParaVolley (WPV) organizes the following international sitting volleyball tournaments:

Senior

Europe (PVE) 
The ParaVolley Europe (PVE) organizes the following international sitting volleyball tournaments:

Senior

References 
 FIVB 2017 Media Guide (pages 48–75) – Indoor Volleyball Records
 FIVB 2017 Media Guide (pages 76–103) – Beach Volleyball Records

External links 

 Fédération Internationale de Volleyball (FIVB)
 Confédération Africaine de Volleyball (CAVB)
 Asian Volleyball Confederation (AVC)
 Confédération Européenne de Volleyball (CEV)
 North, Central America and Caribbean Volleyball Confederation (NORCECA)
 Confederación Sudamericana de Voleibol (CSV)
 World ParaVolley (WPV)
 ParaVolley Europe (PVE)